Guy Mathez is a Swiss football manager from Canton of Jura. He is best known for coaching Servette FC from 1982 until 1985 and FC Basel from 1997 until 1999.

References

FC Basel managers
Swiss football managers
Servette FC managers
Living people
1946 births
Sportspeople from the canton of Jura